Staffeldt is a surname. Notable people with the surname include:

Bernhard Ditlef von Staffeldt (1753–1818), Norwegian military officier
Schack von Staffeldt (1769–1826), Danish author
Timo Staffeldt (born 1984), German footballer